The 1983-84 LSU Tigers men's basketball team represented Louisiana State University during the 1983–84 NCAA men's college basketball season. The head coach was Dale Brown. The team was a member of the Southeastern Conference and played their home games at LSU Assembly Center.

The Tigers finished tied for third place in the SEC regular season standings, and lost to Alabama (in OT) in the quarterfinals of the SEC Tournament. LSU received an at-large bid to the NCAA tournament as No. 7 seed in the West region where they lost in the opening round to Dayton. The team finished with an 18–11 record (11–7 SEC).

Roster

Schedule and results

|-
!colspan=9 style=| Exhibition

|-
!colspan=9 style=| Non-conference regular season

|-
!colspan=9 style=| SEC regular season

|-
!colspan=12 style=| SEC Tournament

|-
!colspan=12 style=| NCAA Tournament

Rankings

References

LSU Tigers basketball seasons
Lsu
Lsu
LSU
LSU